Mansurabad (also Romanized as Manşūrābād) is a village in Arabkhaneh Rural District, Shusef District, Nehbandan County, South Khorasan Province, Iran. At the 2006 census, its population was 82, in 24 families.

References 

Populated places in Nehbandan County